is a Japanese voice actress from Osaka Prefecture, Japan. She is affiliated with Pro-Fit.

Voice roles
Bold denotes leading roles.

Anime
2007
Gakuen Utopia Manabi Straight! as Taikai Uehara

2011
Sket Dance as Saori Yasuda (eps 28, 33)
Mashiroiro Symphony as Mitsuko Yukimori (ep 3)
Penguindrum as Ringo Oginome, Hikari Utada

2012
Acchi Kocchi as Ami Kirino
Hiiro no Kakera as Tamaki Kasuga
Pretty Rhythm: Dear My Future as So Min
Saki as Kei Arakawa
Jewelpet Kira☆Deco! as Chocolat Roco

2013
Pretty Rhythm: Rainbow Live as Ms. Umeda (ep3-4)
Rescue Me! as Anna Ozono
Silver Spoon as Aki Mikage
Love Live! as Hideko

2014
Silver Spoon 2 as Aki Mikage
Saki: The Nationals as Kei Arakawa
Monthly Girls' Nozaki-kun as Mamiko
No-Rin as Kanae Sato
Nobunaga Concerto as Mori Bōmaru

2015
The Idolmaster Cinderella Girls as Nana Abe
Seraph of the End as Ako
The Idolmaster Cinderella Girls 2nd Season as Nana Abe
Gatchaman Crowds insight as Kuu-sama

2018
Amai Chōbatsu: Watashi wa Kanshu Senyō Pet as Hina Saotome

2020 
Super HxEros as Minyarin

2022
Utawarerumono: Mask of Truth as Shichiriya

Films
2022
Re:cycle of Penguindrum as Ringo Oginome

Video games
Arknights as Purestream
Azur Lane as Avrora, ROC Ning-Hai
Miracle Snack Shop as Philia Salis
Final Fantasy XIV: Stormblood as Cirina
The Idolmaster series as Nana Abe
World's End Harem VR as Akira Todo
Octopath Traveler II as Mahima

References

External links
 
  

1985 births
Living people
Japanese voice actresses
People from Osaka Prefecture